The Barbican Library is one of the public lending libraries in the City of London. The library has a large collection of books, spoken word recordings, DVDs, CDs and music scores available, most for loan, and some reference material for use on site.
This public library is one of several libraries in Central London.

See also
 Guildhall Library
 London Library
 Women's Library

References

External links

Libraries in the City of London
Public libraries in London